Nicolae Gr. Racoviță (July 17, 1835–) was a Wallachian-born Romanian politician.

Born in Craiova, his parents were the high postelnic Grigore Racoviță and his wife Cleopatra Brăiloiu, daughter of high aga Nicolae Brăiloiu. He studied law at the University of Berlin, obtaining a doctorate. After returning home, he worked in the administrative and judiciary systems. A moderate Liberal, Racoviță served as interim Foreign Minister for three days in December 1870. From December 1870 to March 1871, he was Minister of Religious Affairs and Public Instruction in the cabinet of Ion Ghica. From 1876 to 1880, he was president of the Dolj County Council, and was mayor of his native city from 1888 to 1890.

Racoviță was an editor at Alexandru Odobescu's Bucharest-based magazine Revista istorică in 1862. In 1867, 1868 and 1870, he edited the weekly Nepărtinitorul, a poetic and literary journal. He was friends with the Junimea group, and was a talented pianist who composed sonatas.

He was married to Despina Socolescu, the niece of Theodor Aman. Racoviță died in Rome and was buried in Craiova.

Notes

1835 births
1894 deaths
People from Craiova
Nicolae
Humboldt University of Berlin alumni
Mayors of Craiova
Councillors in Romania
Romanian magazine editors
Romanian Ministers of Education
National Liberal Party (Romania) politicians